Membrane Theory may refer to:

 M-theory, a theory in physics that unifies all of the consistent versions of superstring theory
 Membrane theory of shells, describes the mechanical properties of shells
 Membrane potential, a theory that explained the resting potential of nerve and muscle as a diffusion potential